The 2006–07 Dallas Stars season was the 14th season for the Dallas Stars, and the 40th overall of the franchise. The Stars made one major acquisition, Eric Lindros. With Marty Turco still in goal, and Mike Modano and captain Brenden Morrow leading the team, the Stars qualified for the playoffs for the fourth consecutive season.

Regular season
The Stars tied the Toronto Maple Leafs for the fewest shorthanded goals scored during the regular season, with three.

Season standings

Schedule and results

October

November

December

January

February

March

April

Playoffs

The Dallas Stars ended the 2006–07 regular season as the Western Conference's sixth seed.

Western Conference Quarter-finals: vs. (3) Vancouver Canucks
Vancouver won series 4–3

Player statistics

Regular season
Scoring

Goaltending

Playoffs
Scoring

Goaltending

Transactions

Trades

Free agents acquired

Free agents lost

Draft picks
Dallas' picks at the 2006 NHL Entry Draft in Vancouver, British Columbia.

See also
2006–07 NHL season

References

Game log: Dallas Stars game log on ESPN.com
Team standings: NHL standings on ESPN.com
Player stats: Dallas Stars player stats on ESPN.com

Dall
Dall
Dallas Stars seasons
National Hockey League All-Star Game hosts